BK Jelgava is a professional basketball club based in Jelgava, Latvia playing in the Latvian Basketball League.

At the end of the 2010–11 season, its predecessor, BK Zemgale, experienced financial difficulties, failure to pay their players and liabilities. As a result, BK Jelgava took their place in the Latvian Basketball League. The new club was created and funded by the city of Jelgava.

Roster

References

External links
Official website 

Jelgava
Basketball teams in Latvia